Marigold Sky is the fifteenth studio album by American pop music duo Hall & Oates. The album was released on September 17, 1997, by Push Records. It reached #95 on the Billboard 200 and #179 on the UK Albums Chart. The album features their US Adult Contemporary Top Ten hit, "Promise Ain't Enough", which became one of their biggest hits in some continents notably South America and Southeast Asia. This album also marks their first new release of original material since 1990's Change of Season. It was their first album released as independent artists.

In March 2022, Hall and Oates reissued the album on streaming, vinyl, and CD. The reissue includes three previously unissued bonus tracks.

"I look at 'Marigold Sky' as the lost Hall and Oates album", Daryl Hall said on the reason why they rereleased the said album. "The fans have been asking me for years about it. I'm really proud of these songs and happy to see that it's getting a global re-release", he added. John Oates adds, "I am really pleased that 'Marigold Sky' is finally becoming available around the world. It's a very unique and cool album, and I hope old and new fans really enjoy it."

Track listing

Bonus tracks (2022 reissue)

Production 
 Executive Producer – Daryl Hall
 Producers – David Bellochio and Daryl Hall (Tracks 1-12); John Oates (Tracks 2, 9 & 12).
 Additional Production and Pro Tools Editing – Peter Moshay
 Engineers – David Bellochio, Peter Moshay and Steven Remote.
 Recorded at A-Pawling Studios (Pawling, NY) and Marion Recording Studios (Fairview, NJ).
 Strings (Tracks 3, 4 & 7) recorded by Frank Filipino at Edison Studios (New York City, NY).
 Mixing – David Leonard (Tracks 1-8 & 10-12), Mick Guzauski (Tracks 7 & 9) and Peter Moshay (Track 10) at NCP Studios (New York City, NY).
 Re-mixing on "Hold On To Yourself (remix) – Tommy Musto at NCP Studios (New York City, NY).
 Mastered by Bob Ludwig at Gateway Mastering (Portland, ME).
 Package Design – Phillips Design
 Photography – Brad Hitz
 Management – All Access Entertainment Management Group Inc.

Personnel 
 Daryl Hall – vocals, keyboards, acoustic guitar (1, 2, 5, 6, 8, 10, 11), electric guitar (4, 8, 10, 11), percussion programming (11)
 John Oates – vocals, electric guitar, acoustic guitar (2, 12)
 David Bellochio – keyboards, percussion programming, acoustic guitar (3, 4)
 Ken Sebesky – acoustic guitar (1), electric guitar (1, 3, 4, 9)
 David A. Stewart – electric guitar (1, 6)
 Paul Pesco – electric guitar (2, 5, 7, 10, 11, 12)
 Tom "T-Bone" Wolk – bass (2-4, 6-9, 12), electric guitar (3, 6, 8), acoustic guitar (5)
 Shawn Pelton – drums (1-10, 12), percussion (10)
 Peter Moshay – percussion (10)
 Charles DeChant – saxophone (6, 7)
 Rob Mounsey – string arrangements (3, 4, 7)

References

1997 albums
Hall & Oates albums